Prochowice  is a town in Legnica County, Lower Silesian Voivodeship, in south-western Poland. It is the seat of the administrative district (gmina) called Gmina Prochowice.

As of 2019, the town has a population of 3,602.

References

External links
 Official town webpage

Cities and towns in Lower Silesian Voivodeship
Legnica County